1 Lupi is a solitary giant star in the southern constellation of Lupus. It has the Bayer designation i Lupi; 1 Lupi is the Flamsteed designation. The apparent visual magnitude is 4.90, which indicates it is faintly visible to the naked eye. Based on parallax measurements, this star is approximately 1,800 light-years from the Sun. It is moving closer to the Earth with a heliocentric radial velocity of −23 km/s.

Houk (1978) assigned the spectral classification of this star as F1III, which suggests it is an F-type (yellow-white) star that has evolved away from the main sequence and expanded into a giant. However, Gray et al. (2001) found a class of F0 Ib-II, matching a supergiant/bright giant star. It has a mass around seven times that of the Sun and has expanded to 41 times the Sun's radius. The estimated age of the star is around 47 million years.

References 

F-type giants
Lupus (constellation)
Lupi, i
Lupi, 1
CD-31 11813
135153
074604
5660